Lt Colonel Sir Theobald Hubert Burke, 13th Baronet (25 March 1833 – 4 April 1909) was an Irish soldier and baronet who served during the Crimean war and the Indian Mutiny.

Background
Burke was born in Waterslade House, Tuam, Co. Galway. He was one of six sons of William Burke of Knocknagur of the ancient Galway family, the Burkes of Glinsk.

Career
He was commissioned into the British Army (88th Connaught Rangers) at an early age, and served through the Crimean war and the Indian Mutiny, and later exchanged into the 18th Royal Irish Regiment in 1866, and attained the rank of lieutenant colonel.

Family
He inherited the title from Sir John Lionel Burke, 12th Baronet, in 1884, and when he died in London aged 76 the Baronetcy became extinct.

One brother Thomas Henry Burke was Permanent Under Secretary at the Irish Office.
Another brother Augustus Nicholas Burke was an artist.

Arms

Notes

External links 
 Burke at www.glinsk.com
 

1833 births
1909 deaths
19th-century Irish people
People from Tuam
Baronets in the Baronetage of Ireland
Royal Irish Regiment (1684–1922) officers
88th Regiment of Foot (Connaught Rangers) officers
British Army personnel of the Crimean War
British military personnel of the Indian Rebellion of 1857
Theobald
People from County Galway